The Untouchables is a video game released by Ocean Software in 1989 on ZX Spectrum, Amstrad CPC, Commodore 64, MSX, Atari ST, Amiga, DOS, NES, and SNES. It is based on the film The Untouchables.

Gameplay
A side-scrolling based loosely on the movie, the game plays out some of the more significant parts of the film. Set in Chicago, the primary goal of the game is to take down Al Capone's henchmen and eventually detain Capone.

Reception

Electronic Gaming Monthly gave the Super NES version a 5.8 out of 10, commenting that "This title would have been better if it were Super Scope compatible, for it is a bit difficult to use the pad during the shooting sequences."

The reviewer from Crash called the game "Great stuff. Ocean have brought Chicago to life.  Atmospheric title tune (128k), beautifully detailed graphics and challenging gameplay add up to one addictive mean game!"

Sinclair User commented that "The Untouchables is a cracking conversion. Easily one of the most successful and accurate movie licenses to date."

Paul Rand of Computer and Video Games stated that "The Untouchables is a well thought out package which will find a niche in most people's software collections [...] those who buy it won't be disappointed."

The Games Machine added that "The six levels are all trigger-pumping fun, with suitable graphics to give an authentic Twenties feel, and some nice touches [...] It all make The Untouchables a winner."

References

External links
The Untouchables at MobyGames
Review in Info

1989 video games
Amiga games
Atari ST games
Commodore 64 games
DOS games
Golden Joystick Award for Game of the Year winners
MSX games
Nintendo Entertainment System games
Ocean Software games
Organized crime video games
Super Nintendo Entertainment System games
The Untouchables
Video games about police officers
Video games based on films
Video games based on adaptations
Video games developed in the United Kingdom
Video games set in Chicago
ZX Spectrum games